This is a list of census-designated places in the U.S. state of Illinois, by county.

Adams County
 North Quincy

Alexander County
 Olive Branch

Champaign County
 Lake of the Woods
 Penfield
 Seymour

Christian County
 Langleyville

Clark County
 West Union

Crawford County
 Annapolis
 West York

Franklin County
 Mulkeytown

Jackson County
 Harrison

Jefferson County
 Opdyke

Jo Daviess County
 Apple Canyon Lake
 The Galena Territory

Kane County
 Prestbury

Kendall County

Oswego Township
 Boulder Hill

Knox County
 Gilson
 Oak Run

LaSalle County

Dayton Township
 Dayton

Northville Township
 Lake Holiday

Lake County
 Knollwood
 Lake Catherine
 Long Lake
 Venetian Village

Antioch Township
 Channel Lake

Ela Township
 Forest Lake

Grant Township
 Fox Lake Hills

Warren Township
 Gages Lake
 Grandwood Park

Logan County
 Beason
 Chestnut
 Cornland

Macon County
 Boody

Madison County
 Holiday Shores
 Mitchell
 Rosewood Heights

Mason County
 Goofy Ridge

McDonough County
 Adair
 Georgetown

McHenry County
 Alden
 Big Foot Prairie
 Burtons Bridge
 Chemung
 Coral
 Franklinville
 Harmony
 Hartland
 Lawrence
 Pistakee Highlands
 Ridgefield
 Riley
 Solon Mills

McLean County
 Twin Grove

Menard County
 Lake Petersburg

Ogle County
 Grand Detour
 Lost Nation

Piatt County
 La Place
 White Heath

Peoria County
 Lake Camelot
 Rome

Rock Island County
 Coyne Center
 Rock Island Arsenal

Shelby County
 Westervelt

St. Clair County
 Darmstadt
 Floraville
 Paderborn
 Rentchler
 Scott Air Force Base

Stephenson County
 Lake Summerset

Tazewell County
 Heritage Lake

Vermilion County
 Olivet

Whiteside County
 Como

Will County
 Crystal Lawns
 Fairmont
 Frankfort Square
 Ingalls Park
 Lakewood Shores
 Preston Heights
 Willowbrook

Williamson County
 Crab Orchard

Winnebago County
 Lake Summerset

Former CDPs
 Goodings Grove, incorporated and renamed as village of Homer Glen
 Wonder Lake, annexed by village of Wonder Lake

See also
 List of municipalities in Illinois
 List of Illinois townships
 List of precincts in Illinois
 List of unincorporated communities in Illinois

Census-designated places
Illinois